Chahar Murun-e Jowkar (also Romanized as Chahār Mūrūn-e Jowkār; also known as Chahār Mūrūn) is a village in Margown Rural District, Margown District, Boyer-Ahmad County, Kohgiluyeh and Boyer-Ahmad Province, Iran. At the 2006 census, its population was 300, in 51 families.

References 

Populated places in Boyer-Ahmad County